Sholinganallur is a residential locality of Chennai, India.

Sholinganallur may also refer to:

 Sholinganallur (state assembly constituency)
 Sholinganallur taluk
 Sholinganallur Prathyangira Devi Temple